Old Heidelberg is a 1915 American silent romance film directed by John Emerson and starring Wallace Reid, Dorothy Gish and Karl Formes. It is an adaptation of the 1901 play Old Heidelberg by Wilhelm Meyer-Förster, the first of five film versions which have been made. The film still survives, unlike many productions of the era.

Cast
 Wallace Reid as Prince Karl Heinrich 
 Dorothy Gish as Katie Ruder 
 Karl Formes as Dr. Juttner 
 Erich von Stroheim as Lutz 
 Raymond Wells as Karl Bilz 
 John McDermott as Von Wendell  
 James Gibson as Kellerman 
 Franklin Arbuckle as Fritz Ruder - Katie's Father 
 Madge Hunt as Frau Hans Ruder - Katie's Aunt 
 Erich von Ritzau as Prince Rudolf 
 Kate Toncray as Frau Fritz Ruder - Katie's Mother 
 Harold Goodwin as Prince Karl - Age 12 
 Francis Carpenter as Prince Karl - Age 5

References

Bibliography
 Lennig, Arthur. Stroheim. University Press of Kentucky, 2004.

External links

1915 films
1910s romance films
American romance films
American silent feature films
Films directed by John Emerson
American films based on plays
Films about princes
Films set in Heidelberg
American black-and-white films
1910s English-language films
1910s American films